Mathew Yakubu (born 9 March 1999) is a Nigerian professional footballer who plays as a goalkeeper.

Club career

ŠKF Sereď
Yakubu made his Fortuna Liga debut for iClinic Sereď against ViOn Zlaté Moravce on 11 July 2020. He conceded the sole goal of the match from András Mészáros.

References

External links
 
 Futbalnet profile 
 

1999 births
Living people
Nigerian footballers
Association football goalkeepers
ŠKF Sereď players
Slovak Super Liga players
Expatriate footballers in Slovakia
Nigerian expatriate sportspeople in Slovakia
People from Zaria